Deh-e Hoseyn (also Romanized as Deh-e Ḩoseyn and Deh Ḩoseyn; also known as Deh-e Ḩasan and Deh Husain) is a village in Hendudur Rural District, Sarband District, Shazand County, Markazi Province, Iran. At the 2006 census, its population was 70, in 20 families.

References 

Populated places in Shazand County